Juan Pedro Amestoy Borteiro (1925–2010) was a Uruguayan accountant, politician and ambassador. He was born in Montevideo, Uruguay on September 20, 1925 and died on February 12, 2010.

Education and career
Amestoy graduated from the Faculty of Economics and Management, University of the Republic in 1957 with degree in public accounting.

In the public service he held the positions of advisor to the Ministry of Finance (1959-1966), Minister of Industry and Trade in 1971–1972, at the end of the presidency of Jorge Pacheco Areco. Later, at the beginning of the presidency of Juan Maria Bordaberry, he served as the president of Central Bank of Uruguay (1972-1973).

He performed for 21 years in the field of diplomacy, serving as Ambassador of Uruguay in Peru (1974-1977), Egypt (1977-1980), USSR (1982-1987) and Mexico (1990-1995). He was also active at the Ministry of Foreign Affairs, as Director of International Economic Affairs (1980-1982) and Chief Technical and Administrative Affairs (1988-1990).

In the area of teaching, he was Professor of Practical Courses in Finance and Public Administration (1958-1960) and Member of the Examiners Councils of Public Finance and Customs Law and International Economic Policy (1958-1961).

At the international level he was an official adviser to the Economic Commission for Latin America (CEPAL (1966-1970) and adviser to the American Council of Commerce and Production (CICYP) (1964-1966).

He authored "Stalin versus Trotsky-Largo camino hacia un asesinato'' (Stalin versus Trotsky-Long road to an assassination) (May 2004).

References

1925 births
2010 deaths
Politicians from Montevideo
University of the Republic (Uruguay) alumni
Uruguayan accountants
Ambassadors of Uruguay to Egypt
Ambassadors of Uruguay to Mexico
Ambassadors of Uruguay to Peru
Ambassadors of Uruguay to the Soviet Union
Presidents of the Central Bank of Uruguay
Government ministers of Uruguay